Milligan is an unincorporated community in Okaloosa County, Florida, United States.

From June 3, 1915 (when Okaloosa County was formed) until the Yellow River flooded in 1917, Milligan was the county seat.

Notable people
 Joe Fuller - NFL player
 Houston McTear - World record holder, 100-yard dash
 Maulty Moore - NFL player

References

Unincorporated communities in Okaloosa County, Florida
Unincorporated communities in Florida
Former county seats in Florida